"Diamonds" is a song by American rapper Megan Thee Stallion and American singer Normani. It was released on January 10, 2020, by Atlantic, as the lead single from the soundtrack to the film Birds of Prey. The song samples "Diamonds Are a Girl's Best Friend" by Marilyn Monroe, making this the first song to directly sample the jazz classic according to the music blog Idolator.

Background and composition
The collaboration was announced in December 2019. The single art was unveiled and the song was released on January 10, 2020. "Diamonds" was written by Edgar Machuca, Jule Styne, Kameron Glasper, Leo Robin, Louis Bell, Madison Love, Megan Thee Stallion, Mike Arrow, Normani, Santeri Kauppinen, and Tayla Parx; it was produced by Bell and MD$. "Diamonds" is a pop and hip hop song with lyrics of female empowerment and moving on from a relationship.

Critical reception
Harper's Bazaars Erica Gonzales wrote that "the high-energy track is a perfect fit for Megan's razor-sharp flow, while Normani gracefully interpolates Marilyn Monroe's "Diamonds Are a Girl's Best Friend" in the melody". Billboard called it "a gem of a song". Madeline Roth of MTV described the song as "a total flex anthem". Time named it one of the five best songs of the week. XXL magazine also named it one of the best new tracks of the week.

Music video
A music video for the song was released on January 10, 2020.

The video sees the artists in a "dark" amusement house spliced with scenes of the film, including a sequence of Harley Quinn which was inspired by Marilyn Monroe's version of "Diamonds Are a Girl's Best Friend" from the 1953 film Gentlemen Prefer Blondes.

Credits and personnel
Credits adapted from Tidal.

Megan Thee Stallion – vocals, songwriter
Normani Kordei Hamilton – vocals, songwriter
Marilyn Monroe – background vocals
Edgar Machuca – songwriter 
Jule Styne – songwriter
Kameron Glasper – songwriter
Leo Robin – songwriter
Madison Love – songwriter
Mike Arrow – songwriter
Santeri Kauppinen – songwriter
Tayla Parx – songwriter
Louis Bell – songwriter, producer
MD$ – producer
Jaime P. Velez – engineering, vocal production
Michele Mancini – mastering
Manny Marroquin – mixing

Charts

Release history

References

2020 singles
2020 songs
DC Extended Universe music
Marilyn Monroe
Megan Thee Stallion songs
Normani songs
Song recordings produced by Louis Bell
Songs written by Kam Parker
Songs written by Louis Bell
Songs with music by Jule Styne
Songs with lyrics by Leo Robin
Songs written by Madison Love
Songs written by Megan Thee Stallion
Songs written by Normani
Songs written by Tayla Parx
Songs written for films
Pop-rap songs